Park Kyung-won (24 June 1901 – 7 August 1933) was, along with Kwon Ki-ok of the Republic of China Air Force, one of the earliest Korean female aviators. Though it is generally agreed that Kwon was the first female pilot, Park is still recognised as the first Korean female civilian pilot, as Kwon was trained by the Republic of China Air Force. She was the subject of the controversial 2005 South Korean film Blue Swallow, in which she was portrayed by actress Jang Jin-young.

Early life
Park was born in Daegu, Gyeongsang-do. From 1912 to 1916, she attended Daegu's Myeongsin Women's School, a Presbyterian missionary school operated by Americans; a year after her graduation, on 13 September 1917, she departed her hometown for Japan. Upon her arrival in Japan, she initially settled in Yokohama's Minamiyoshida-machi, where she enrolled in the Kasahara Industrial Training School, spending two and a half years. From 1919, she began attending a Korean church in Yokohama, and later converted to Christianity. In February 1920, she returned to Daegu to enter a nursing school there; though her true aim was to become a pilot, she needed to earn money for the tuition fees first.

Aviation career
In January 1925, Park returned to Japan, where she finally enrolled in an aviation school in Kamata (present-day Ōta, Tokyo). She had initially hoped to attend the same flight school as An Chang-nam, the first Korean male pilot, but it had burned down in 1923. She graduated and took the test for her third-class pilot's licence on 25 January 1927; she obtained the licence three days later. On 30 July of the following year, she obtained her second-class pilot's licence.

On 4 May 1933, Park was chosen to fly on a new route between Japan and Manchukuo. She flew to Seoul on 19 May to meet with government officials there. At 10:35 AM on 7 August 1933, she took off in her Salmson 2A2 biplane, named the Blue Swallow, from Tokyo's Haneda Airport on one such flight to Manchuria; she crashed 42 minutes later near Hakone, Kanagawa and died.

References

Further reading

1901 births
1933 deaths
Aviation pioneers
Aviators killed in aviation accidents or incidents in Japan
Converts to Christianity
Women aviators
Korean aviators
Korean Presbyterians
People from Daegu
People of Korea under Japanese rule
Victims of aviation accidents or incidents in 1933